The leu (sign: L; ISO 4217 code: MDL) is the currency of Moldova. Like the Romanian leu, the Moldovan leu ( lei) is subdivided into 100 bani ( ban). The name of the currency originates from a Romanian word which means "lion".

Etymology
The name of the currency means "lion", and is derived from the Dutch thaler ( "lion thaler/dollar"). The Dutch leeuwendaalder was imitated in several German and Italian cities. These coins circulated in Moldova, Romania and Bulgaria and gave their name to their respective currencies: the Moldovan leu, the Romanian leu and the Bulgarian lev.

History
Between 1918 and 1940 and again between 1941 and 1944, when Moldova was part of Romania, the Romanian leu was used in what was then the eastern part of the broader Romanian region of Moldavia (Moldova in Romanian). The Moldovan leu was established on 29 November 1993, following the collapse of the Soviet Union and the creation of the independent Republic of Moldova. It replaced the temporary cupon currency at a rate of 1 leu = 1000 cupon.

In Transnistria, an unrecognized breakaway state which is internationally recognized as part of Moldova, the Transnistrian ruble is used instead. The currency is not honoured by Moldova or any other state.

Coins
A first series of mostly small aluminum coins entered circulation in November 1993. A second series consisting of larger denomination coins was issued in 2018.
Most Moldovan coins are minted at the Monetăria Statului in Romania.

First series (1993–present)
In November 1993, the National Bank of Moldova (NBM) issued its first coins of 1, 5, 25 and 50 bani and 1 and 5 lei.

The 1 and 5 lei coins were withdrawn from circulation in 1994. Due to their low quality and relatively high nominal value many forgeries appeared.

In April 1996, a 10 bani coin was introduced.

In 1997, the NBM announced that it would replace the existing aluminum 50 bani coin with a new one made from brass-plated steel with a new and improved design featuring anti-counterfeit elements such as reeding. A first for modern Moldovan coins.

The new 50 bani coins were put into circulation on 2 February 1998. At the same time the NBM began withdrawing old aluminum 50 bani coins. They were demonitized on 1 January 1999.

1 ban coins remain legal tender but are rarely used or seen in circulation, effectively leading to "Swedish rounding".

Second series (2018–present) 
In 2017, the NBM announced plans to reintroduce 1 and 5 lei coins alongside new 2 and 10 lei coins citing "superior durability and cheaper manufacturing and maintenance cost over time compared to banknotes" as the main reason and asking people to submit their designs for the new coins. The design of the new coins was unveiled on February 28, 2018, featuring elements of both the coat of arms of the Principality of Moldavia on the obverse and the coat of arms of the Republic of Moldova on the reverse, with 1 and 2 lei coins being made from nickel-plated steel and 5 and 10 lei coins featuring a bi-metallic design with elements made from nickel-plated steel and brass-plated steel. The new coins were put into circulation starting 28 February 2018. All of the new lei coins are currently intended to be used alongside banknotes of equal value.

Commemorative coins
Since 1996, several commemorative coins for collectors have been issued. A complete listing can be found here.

Banknotes
There have been two series of Moldovan leu banknotes. The first series was short-lived and only included 1, 5, and 10 lei. The front of all of these notes—and all subsequent notes—feature a portrait of Ștefan cel Mare (Stephen the Great, also known as Stephen III of Moldavia), the prince of Moldavia from 1457 to 1504.
The first two lines of the Miorița (The Little Ewe) ballad appear on the back, printed vertically between the denomination numeral and the vignette of the fortress. The Miorița is an old Romanian pastoral ballad considered one of the most important pieces of Romanian folklore. The lines “Pe-un picior de plai, Pe-o gură de rai” translate as “Near a low foothill, at Heaven’s doorsill.”

 On the front side of each banknote only one man is represented - the best-known ruler of Moldavia - Ștefan cel Mare (Stephen the Great).
 The first two lines of the Miorița ballad are written in the white circle on the front side of each banknote.
 On the back side of all the banknotes there are depicted Trajan's Column and The Endless Column.

Moldovan leu banknotes were notable for not using intaglio printing until 2015: the main security features on all denominations were limited, initially consisting mainly of a watermark of Ștefan, a solid security thread, and a see-through registration device. In 2015, the National Bank of Moldova finally rolled out intaglio printing and embossing for denominations between 10 and 500 lei, and also introduced revised security features on all denominations except for 1,000 lei. The banknote for 1,000 lei, valued at €51.60 by currency exchange service XE.com on 31 December 2019, continues to use the original design.

Exchange rates

See also
 Economy of Moldova

References

External links
 
 Catalog of Banknotes of Moldova
 The banknotes of Moldova 

Leu, Moldovan
Currencies introduced in 1993